Bande Ali Mia (17 January 1906 – 27 June 1979) was a Bangladeshi poet, lyricist, novelist, dramatist, essayist, children’s writer and journalist. He was awarded the Bangla Academy Literary Award in 1962 and Ekushey Padak in 1988.

Early life and career
Mia was born in Radhanagar, Pabna. He passed the entrance examination in 1923 from the Majumder Academy. He then studied painting at the Indian Art Academy in Calcutta in 1927. He worked as a journalist for the magazine Islam Darshan. He also taught at a Calcutta Corporation School during 1930–1950. His first book, Chor Jamai, was published in 1921 by Calcutta Ashutosh Library. He authored a total of 84 books, most of which feature a rural setting. Another work, Maynamotir Char, was published in 1931 by DM Library in Calcutta. He was the editor of the periodicals Bikash and Bhorer Alo. Later he worked as a script-writer at Rajshahi Radio Station until his death in 1979.

Legacy
Mia's poems were included in the curriculum of school level, secondary and higher secondary Bengali literature in Bangladesh. A school, Kobi Bonde Ali High School, was established in 1988.

Awards
 Bangla Academy Literary Award (1962)
 President's Award (1965) 
 Uttara Sahitya Majlis Padak (1977)
 Ekushey Padak (1988)

Works
Bande's noteworthy work include the following.

Poetry
Mainamatir Char (1930)
Anurag (1932)
Padmanadir Char (1953)
Madhumatir Char (1953)
Dharitri (1975)
Yaram (1981)
Leelasangini

Novels
Basanta Jagrata Dhare (1931)
Shes Lagna (1941)
Aranya Godhuli (1949)
Nibbhrasta (1958)
Taser Ghar (1954)
Nari Rahashyamayee

Play
Masnad (1931)
Baner Phul
Kamal Ataturk
Joar Bhata

Juvenile literature
Chor Jamai (1927)
Mrighapori (1932)
Bagher Ghare Ghoger Basa (1932)
Shonar Harin (1939)
Shiyal Panditer Pathshala (1956)
Kunchbaran Kanya (1961)
Sat Rajyer Galpa (1977)
Kamal Ataturk (1937)
Sharat Chandra and Chhotoder Nazrul (1958)
Dayni Bou (1959)
Rupkotha (1960)
Hadisher Golpo
Galper Asar
Shikarer Galpo
Bhuter Haate
Sundarbaner Bibhisika

References

1906 births
1979 deaths
Bangladeshi male poets
Bengali male poets
Bengali-language poets
20th-century Bangladeshi poets
20th-century Bangladeshi male writers
Recipients of Bangla Academy Award
Recipients of the Ekushey Padak

People from Pabna District
Bengali Muslims